Borée was a  74-gun ship of the line of the French Navy.

Career 
In 1790, she joined the Brest squadron. Between May 1792 and January 1793, under Captain de Grimouard, she escorted a convoy from Saint Domingue to Rochefort,  before being decommissioned.

On 12 April 1794, she was ordered razeed into a 50-gun frigate and renamed Ça Ira. Two months later, she was again renamed to Agricola. Recommissioned on 24 June, she served for two years before being hulked in Rochefort and used as a hospital.

She was eventually broken up in 1803

Notes, citations, and references
Notes

Citations

References

Ships of the line of the French Navy
Téméraire-class ships of the line
1785 ships